The Foulées du Gois is an international road running race held annually on the Passage du Gois, a tidal causeway between Beauvoir-sur-Mer and the Île de Noirmoutier, France. The event is the second-most publicised in the département of Vendée (85), after the Vendée Globe round-the-world yacht race.

Racing history and records
The idea for a race on the Passage du Gois was conceived in the late stages of 1986, with Jo Cesbron the founding president of the 'Foulées du Gois'. The first event was held on June 20, 1987. The race takes place annually in early summer, most frequently in the month of June, due to the logistics of tide heights, daylight hours, and water temperatures; the race generally starts in the evening.

The professional race, which is limited to 30 competitors selected from French and international applicants, begins when the water first crosses the road. The leaders often finish with water up to their ankles, while those who have got caught in the rising swell are often forced to swim to the finish line. The current record for the race is 12 minutes and 8 seconds, by French athlete and Olympian Dominique Chauvelier in the 1990 running of the event.

Conditions and geography

The Passage du Gois is at the convergence point of two water currents; the Bay of Bourgneuf current to the left of the runners and the Fromentine current to right. The athletes use the wave caused by this meeting as a path, as it provides less resistance to wading compared to undisturbed water. However, at high tide, the Bay of Bourgneuf current is stronger than the Fromentine current, and the wave line alters its course off the causeway.

References

Recurring events established in 1987
Athletics competitions in France
Long-distance running competitions
Sport in Vendée
1987 establishments in France